The Cambrian Journal (Vol. 111, 1858) contains a list of names for about 200 Welsh apples, the majority of which were from the Monmouth area. 

In 1999 a single apple tree was identified by Ian Sturrock on Bardsey Island (located at the end of the Llŷn Peninsula in North Wales). Its uniqueness and the rugged location was seized upon by the media and it was described as "The rarest tree in the world". This media coverage seems to have sparked a resurgence in Welsh apple varieties. The gnarled and twisted tree, growing by the side of Plas Bach, is believed to be the only survivor of an orchard that was tended by the monks who lived there a thousand years ago. In 1998, experts on the varieties of British apples at the National Fruit Collection in Brogdale stated that they believed this tree was the only example of a previously unrecorded cultivar, the Bardsey Apple. The cultivar has since been propagated by grafting and is available commercially.

The National Botanic Garden of Wales at Llanarthney, Carmarthenshire is planting a Welsh Apple variety collection and hopes to publish a Welsh Pomona in the coming years, with over 50 varieties with Welsh or possible Welsh connections, but not including Foreman's Crew (1826 from Merthyr Tydfil) which remains lost.

Several dozen cultivars are available commercially. There is a Welsh Perry and Cider Society and several commercial orchards growing Welsh varieties, as well as school and community groups with small orchards.

Lost varieties
The list given in the 1858 Cambrian Journal includes the following varieties:

 Afal Basst
 Afal Gwdyr
 Afal Illtud
 Afal Madog
 Blas Y Cwrw
 Cydodyn
 Pippin Bach Llydan
 Pippin Dulas
 Rhobin

There is no further record of any of these cultivars in later documents.

In a two-year study, which involved finding, cataloguing and preserving new apple and pear varieties in Wales, researchers uncovered 73 previously unrecorded varieties of Welsh cider apples and perry pears: These are bringing the total number varieties native to the country to 101. The study has been jointly run by University of South Wales and the Welsh Perry & Cider Society.

List of current varieties

References

Welsh
Agriculture in Wales